17208 / 08 Sainagar Shirdi–Vijayawada Express is a Express train belonging to Indian Railways Southern Railway zone that run between  and  in India.

Service 
It operates as train number 17207 from Sainagar Shirdi to Vijayawada Junction and as train number 17208 in the reverse direction, serving the states of Maharashtra, Karnataka, Telangana & Andhra Pradesh .

Coaches

The 17207 / 08 Sainagar Shirdi–Vijayawada Express has one AC 2-tier,  one AC 3-tier, seven sleeper class, five general unreserved & two SLR (seating with luggage rake) coaches . It carries a pantry car.

As with most train services in India, coach composition may be amended at the discretion of Indian Railways depending on demand.

Routing

Traction

References

External links
17207 Sainagar Shirdi Vijayawada Express at India Rail Info
17208 Vijayawada Sainagar Shirdi Express at India Rail Info

Express trains in India
Rail transport in Maharashtra
Rail transport in Karnataka
Rail transport in Telangana
Rail transport in Andhra Pradesh
Transport in Vijayawada
Transport in Shirdi